Unnamed 10 is an Indian reserve of the Taku River Tlingit in British Columbia. It is located in the Atlin townsite and occupies 2.8 hectares.

References

Indian reserves in British Columbia